Asa'pili is a constructed language created by Swiss author P.M. in his book Bolo'bolo. On the one hand, it is an artistic language, intended to explain his concepts for a sustainable future in an original way. On the other hand, it is a neutral auxiliary language intended for use in the quasi-utopian bolo-based global community which he describes in the book.  Asa'pili is not a full language, but a basic vocabulary of about thirty words, which can be used to refer to cultural institutions and concepts.

Vocabulary 
The complete list of the basic words is as follows:

All these terms are accompanied by corresponding abstract glyphs, so that the concepts can be represented visually independently of any specific writing system.  These words can be combined into modifier-modified compounds (with the two elements separated by an apostrophe), so that asa'pili means "world language", fasi'ibu means "traveler", vudo'dala means "county-level assembly", etc.  Doubling a noun changes it into a collective or abstract noun, so that bolo'bolo means "all bolos, the system of bolos".

References

Bibliography
1983: bolo'bolo (8th ed. 2003)  ; English edition 

Constructed languages
Artistic languages
International auxiliary languages
Constructed languages introduced in the 1980s